Szabolcs Pál (born 14 January 1988) is a Hungarian football player who currently plays for Érd.

Pál made his debut for the club on 1 December 2010 in a 4–0 defeat to Paks in the Hungarian League Cup.

References

External links

Szabolcs Pál at FuPa
Szabolcs Pál at ÖFB

1988 births
Living people
Footballers from Budapest
Hungarian footballers
Hungarian expatriate footballers
Association football forwards
Nemzeti Bajnokság I players
Nemzeti Bajnokság II players
Regionalliga players
Vasas SC players
MTK Budapest FC players
BKV Előre SC footballers
Integrál-DAC footballers
Diósgyőri VTK players
BFC Siófok players
MŠK Novohrad Lučenec players
Egri FC players
3. Liga (Slovakia) players
Hungarian expatriate sportspeople in Germany
Hungarian expatriate sportspeople in Slovakia
Hungarian expatriate sportspeople in Austria
Expatriate footballers in Germany
Expatriate footballers in Slovakia
Expatriate footballers in Austria